Sir Francis Slingsby (1569–1651) was an English-born soldier who settled in Ireland following service as an officer during the Nine Years' War. 

The ninth and youngest son of apparently recusant Yorkshire Catholic parents, Francis and Mary ( Percy) Slingsby, the younger Francis married Elizabeth Cuffe shortly after arriving in Kilmallock, County Limerick. She was a daughter of Hugh Cuffe, an early settler in the Munster Plantation who held estates in northern County Cork. Slingsby acquired lands at Kilmore through his marriage, and his family were established as prominent figures in Munster.

He sat as MP for Bandonbridge in the Parliament of Ireland from 1639 to 1645.

References

Bibliography
 MacCarthy-Morrogh, Michael. The Munster Plantation: English Migration to Southern Ireland, 1583-1641. Clarendon Press, 1986.
 Murphy, Noel. Francis Slingsby: Elizabethan Adventurer 1569 – 1651. Family Histories at Limerick City Library.

1569 births
1651 deaths
People of Elizabethan Ireland
Military personnel of the Nine Years' War
English soldiers
English emigrants to Ireland
Irish knights
Irish MPs 1639–1649
Members of the Parliament of Ireland (pre-1801) for County Cork constituencies